Ana Luisa Branger (born early 1920s) is remembered as a pioneering female aviator from Venezuela. She received her license in 1942 after training at the Escuela de Aviación Miguel Rodríguez in Maracay. In November 1939, Mary Calcaño had in fact become the first Venezuelan to be granted a pilot's license, although she had received it from the United States authorities after training in Long Island, New York.

Branger was the first woman to graduate from Michel Rodriguez, the country's only pilot training school in the 1940s. Shortly after receiving her license, she joined the Centro de Instrucción de Aeronáutica Civil at the La Carlota air base. She flew not only in Venezuela but also in Peru and in the United States where she broke two world records.

In 1950, she broke the record for light-plane high altitude flying, reaching a height of 24,504 feet in a Cub Special with a Continental C-90-8F 90 hp engine, substantially higher than the 18,999 feet achieved by Elizabeth Boselli. The following year, she again broke the record for high altitude when she flew at 28,820 feet, breaking René Leduc's record of 25,000 feet. Both these achievements were covered by the international press.

Branger is also remembered for her post as cultural attaché at Venezuela's embassy in Washington, D.C.

See also 
 Luisa Elena Contreras Mattera

References

1920s births
People from Aragua
Venezuelan aviators
Venezuelan women aviators
Flight altitude record holders
Women aviation record holders
Year of death missing